Gopal Singha Dev II was the fifty-eighth king of the Mallabhum. He ruled from 1809 to 1876 CE.

History
Gopal Singha Dev II lived on the stipend given by the East India Company. His period of rule was 67 years and it was maximum among all the Malla Kings.

References

Sources
 

Malla rulers
Kings of Mallabhum
19th-century Indian monarchs
Mallabhum